This is a list of subcultures.

A
 Africanfuturism
 Afrofuturism
 Anarcho-punk
 Athlete

B
 BDSM
 Beat Generation, see beatnik
 Bent edge
 Bikers, see motorcycle clubs and outlaw motorcycle clubs
 Bōsōzoku
 Bills
 Biopunk
 Bird Watching
 Bodybuilding
 Bohemianism
 Bro
 Bronies
 Bodgies & Widgies
 Bogan

C
 Cacophony Society
 Car club
 Casuals
 Choir
 Chonga
 Christian
 Cosplayers
 Crusties
 Cryptozoology
 Cubing
 Cyberpunk
 Cybergoth
 Cholos & Cholas
 Chavs
 Cottagecore

D
 Dandy
 Dark academia
 Deadhead
 Decora
 Deaf culture
 Demoscene
 Dizelaši
 Drag
 Dresiarz

E
 EarthBound fandom
 E-girls and e-boys
 Emo
 Equestrianism
 Eshay

F
 Fandom
 Flappers
 Flat Earth Society
 Freak scene
 Furries
 Futurism

G
 Gabber
 Gamer
 Glam rock
 Glam metal
 Goth subculture
 Greaser
 Gutter punk
 Gopnik
 Grunge
 Geek
 Guido / Goombah

H
 Hacker
 Halbstarke
 Hardcore punk
 Hardline
 Heavy metal subculture
 Metalcore
 Metalheads
 Mötorheadbangers
 Hepcat
 Hip hop culture, see also B-boy, graffiti artists, Krump dancing
 Hippie/Hippy
 Hipster, see hipster (1940s subculture) and hipster (contemporary subculture)
 Hobo
 Hulkamaniac

I
 Incroyables
 Indie
 Industrial, see also rivethead

J
 Jedi
 Juggalo
 Juggling
 Jock
 Junglist

K
 K-pop, see culture of Korea
 Kamčiatka, see culture of 5 vgtu barakas

L
 Lad culture
 La Sape
 Leather subculture
 Live Action Role-Players (LARPers)
 Losties
 Lolita

M
 Maker culture
 Mangas
 Merveilleuses
 Military brat
 Mod, see mod revival

N
 Nerd
 New Romantic
 New Age
 Nudism/Naturism

O
 Ofnik
 Otaku
 Otherkin

P
 Pachuco
 Paninaro
Paranormal hunting/ghost hunting
PC Master Race
 Peckerwood
 Pokémon
 Prepper
 Preppy, see also valley girl and popular clique
 Psychedelia and psychonauts
 Punk subculture

Q
 QAnon

R
 Raggare
 Railfan
 Rave
 Redneck
 Riot grrrl
 Rivethead, see industrial music
 Rockabilly
 Rocker
 Role-playing gamers
 Rude boy
 Roadmen

S
 Seapunk
 Scene
 Science fiction fandom
 Scooterboy
 Scouting
 Skater
 Skinhead; See also: gay skinhead, redskin, Trojan skinhead, white power skinhead, & suedehead
 Soft grunge
 Soulboy
 Stargate fandom
 Steampunk
 Stilyaga
 Straight edge
 Surf
 Sharpies

T
 Tamarro (Italian subculture from the 90's)
 Teenybopper
 Teddy Boy
 Trekkie
 Trucker
 Tava mamma

U
 Unilalianism
 Ufo Uap tracking 
 Uncyclopedians

V
 Virtual Community
 Vaporwave
 Vocaloid
 VSCO girl
 Viking

W
 Warez scene
 Wikipedians

Y
 Yé-yé
 Yo
 Yuppie

Z
 Zazou
 Zef

See also
 History of modern Western subcultures
 Outline of culture
 List of fandom names
 Youth subculture

Notes

References

 
 
 
 
 

Cultural lists